So Delicious was a hit for the  Baltimore soul/funk group Pockets. It was the 3rd hit for the group which had previously had hits with "Come Go With Me" and "Take It On Up".

Background
The song was backed with a cover of the Delfonics 1968 hit "La-La (Means I Love You)". It appeared on the B side of their album So Delicious which was released in August 1979 on the Arc label. The single, like the album was a joint co-production by Verdine White, and Robert Wright. The arrangements were handled by Jerry Hey.

Charts
The song was a recommended Top Single Pick in the November 3, 1979, issue of Billboard. The song was their third hit. It peaked at No 34 during an 11-week chart run on the R&B singles chart.

References

1979 songs
1979 singles
Columbia Records singles
Songs written by Verdine White
Song recordings produced by Verdine White